Enrico Tivaroni (13 May 1841 – 13 August 1925) was an Italian magistrate and politician. Tivaroni was an Italian senator from 19 December 1925 until his death, on 13 August 1925.

References

1841 births
1925 deaths
People from Zadar
Members of the Senate of the Kingdom of Italy